Henry Rudolph "Peter" Pund (January 27, 1907 – October 17, 1987) was an American college football player.  He was elected to the Georgia Tech Hall of Fame in 1958, the Georgia Sports Hall of Fame in 1977, and the College Football Hall of Fame in 1963.  Pund was never penalized. At Georgia Tech, he was a member of the Sigma Alpha Epsilon fraternity.

Biography
A native of Augusta, Pund was captain of the national champion 1928 Golden Tornado. "I sat at Grant Field and saw a magnificent Notre Dame team suddenly recoil before the furious pounding of one man–Pund, center," said legendary coach Knute Rockne. "Nobody could stop him. I counted 20 scoring plays that this man ruined." After the 1929 Rose Bowl, Pund called "Wrong way" Roy Riegels "the best center I have played against all year. He's a battler, and he never quit."

Pund died September 17, 1987, in Darien, Connecticut. He was cremated. There is a marker for him at Magnolia Cemetery in Atlanta, Georgia.

References

External links
 
 

1907 births
1987 deaths
All-American college football players
Georgia Tech Yellow Jackets football players
College Football Hall of Fame inductees
All-Southern college football players
Players of American football from Augusta, Georgia
American football centers